, the mountain soursop, is a tree and its edible fruit in the Annonaceae family native to Central America, the Amazon, and islands in the Caribbean. It has fibrous fruits.  may be used as a rootstock for cultivated Annonas.

Etymology and common names
The Latin specific epithet montana refers to mountains or "coming from mountains".

Description
The tree is similar to Annona muricata, but has a more spreading crown and glossy leaves. It is slightly hardier and bears fruit throughout the year. It tolerates brief temperature drops down to  when full grown. Its pollen is shed as permanent tetrads. Yellow, fibrous pulp – which is aromatic – is sour and bitter, containing many light-brown, plump seeds. There is history of its use as a traditional medicine.

Distribution
Its natural distribution is:
Caribbean: West Indies
Central America: Costa Rica, Panama
South America: Bolivia, Colombia, Ecuador, Peru, Venezuela, Brazil
United States: Southern Florida

See also
 List of plants of Amazon Rainforest vegetation of Brazil

References

montana
Trees of the Amazon
Trees of Costa Rica
Trees of Panama
Trees of Bolivia
Trees of Colombia
Trees of Ecuador
Trees of Peru
Tropical fruit
Plants described in 1837